Home Is Where the Heart Is may refer to:

 Home Is Where the Heart Is (David Cassidy album), 1976
 Home Is Where the Heart Is (Bobby Womack album), 1976
 Home Is Where the Heart Is (David Grisman album), 1988
 "Home Is Where the Heart Is" (song), a 2013 song by Bliss n Eso
 "Home Is Where The Heart Is", is a song by Elvis Presley from the soundtrack for Kid Galahad, 1962
 "Home Is Where The Heart Is", is a song by Bobby Womack from the album Home Is Where the Heart Is, 1976
 "Home Is Where The Heart Is", is a song by David Grisman from the album Home Is Where the Heart Is, 1988
 "Home Is Where The Heart Is", is a 1977 song by Gladys Knight & the Pips
 "Home Is Where The Heart Is", is a song by Sally Fingerett

See also
Home Is Where the Hart Is, a 1987 American film starring Leslie Nielsen